Brookville Historic District may refer to:

Brookville Historic District (Brookville, Indiana), listed on the NRHP in Ohio 
Brookville Historic District (Brookville, Pennsylvania), listed on the NRHP in Pennsylvania